The 2000 Torneo Godó was the 48th edition of the Torneo Godó annual men's tennis tournament played on clay courts in Barcelona, Spain and it took place from 24 April until 30 April 2000. It was part of the ATP International Series Gold of the 2000 ATP Tour. Unseeded Marat Safin won the singles title.

Finals

Singles

 Marat Safin defeated  Juan Carlos Ferrero, 6–3, 6–3, 6–4.

Doubles

 Nicklas Kulti /  Mikael Tillström defeated  Paul Haarhuis /  Sandon Stolle, 6–2, 6–7(2–7), 7–6(7–5).

References

External links
 ITF tournament details

 
2000
Tennis
Godo